Eoin Murphy may refer to:

 Eoin Murphy (Waterford hurler) (born 1978)
 Eoin Murphy (Kilkenny hurler) (born 1990)

See also
 Eoghan Murphy
 Owen Murphy (disambiguation)